Elections to Winchester City Council took place on Thursday 2 May 2019, alongside other local elections across the country. The Conservatives Party held a narrow majority of one at the last election, with the seats contested in this election being last contested in 2016 election. The Conservatives defended 10 seats, whilst the Liberal Democrats defended 4. Town and parish councils in the city boundary were also up for election.

Background 
Prior to the election, the Conservatives had held overall control of Winchester City Council since 2015, with the Liberal Democrats having last controlled the council between 2010 and 2011. No other parties have held seats in Winchester since the 2016 election, in which the boundaries were redrawn. In June 2018, after the previous election, one Conservative councillor left the party to sit as an independent over concerns about redevelopment of the city. In July, a Liberal Democrat councillor, who had previously defected from the Conservatives, defected back to the Conservatives after disputes about the leadership of the council; subsequently the independent councillor joined the Liberal Democrats. The statement of persons nominated for the 2019 election was revealed 4 April 2019.

Election results 
As the council is elected in thirds, one councillor for each of the 16 wards are elected each year. All comparisons in wards and swing are to the corresponding 2016 election (when the current boundaries were created), whilst the council as a whole is to the 2018 election. A total of 40,317 votes were cast, with a turnout of 45.10%. This was the best result for the Liberal Democrats for around fifteen years. Labour's vote also fell, whilst the Greens' rose. The next election was scheduled to take place in May 2020, one year later, but due to the COVID-19 pandemic, were delayed until 2021, where they were scheduled to take place at the same time of those already planned, which in the context of Winchester included the next Hampshire County Council Election.

After the previous election and immediately prior to this election, the composition of the council was:

After the election result, the composition of the council became:

Results by ward

Alresford & Itchen Valley

Badger Farm & Oliver's Battery

Bishops Waltham

Central Meon Valley

Colden Common & Twyford

Denmead

Southwick & Wickham

St Barnabas

St Bartholomew

St Luke

St Michael

St Paul

The Worthys

Upper Meon Valley

Whiteley & Shedfield

Wonston & Micheldever

References

2019 English local elections
2019
2010s in Hampshire
May 2019 events in the United Kingdom